Legi Matiu (born 17 January 1969, in Auckland) is a former New Zealand-born rugby union player who has represented France playing at lock and number eight.

Legi Matiu played in 19 European competition games, including eight in the European Cup with Biarritz and 11 European challenge with Biarritz and FC Grenoble. His first international cap for France was on 5 February 2000 against Wales, and his second and last on 19 February 2000 the same year against England.

References

External links 
 Legi Matiu - France, ESPN
 http://origin.ercrugby.com/eng/statistiques/22515.php?includeref=dynamic&player=1180  

Living people
French rugby union players
Biarritz Olympique players
France international rugby union players
1969 births
Rugby union locks
Rugby union players from Auckland
People educated at St Paul's College, Auckland